AfterShip is a Hong Kong startup company offering shipment tracking through SaaS (software as a service) model. It was founded after winning the Startup Weekend Hong Kong 2011 and Global Startup Battle 2011.

AfterShip received $1 million series A investment from IDG Capital Partners (IDG-Accel) in May 2014.

Technology
AfterShip provides automated shipment tracking as a service, supporting over 600 shipping services worldwide, including UPS, FedEx and DHL. AfterShip provides users a dashboard to check the status of shipments across multiple carriers, and sends out emails and notifications automatically at different shipment stages.

AfterShip integrates with major e-commerce platforms like Shopify, Bigcommerce, eBay, Floship and Magento.

In Jan 2014, AfterShip launched a package tracking API that allows online retailers to get tracking information from different carriers via AfterShip as a single source. Online retailers can use AfterShip API to display tracking details and information on the website, and monitor carriers’ delivery performance over time.

See also
 Order fulfillment
 Fulfillment house
 Logistics

References

2011 establishments in Hong Kong
Software companies of Hong Kong